Svalbard Radio is a coast radio station established in 1911 at Finneset in Svalbard, Norway. In 1930, it moved to Skjæringa in Longyearbyen and since 1975 it has been co-located with Svalbard Airport, Longyear. It has been remote-controlled from Bodø Radio since 2006.

References

Coast radio stations in Norway
Longyearbyen
Communications in Svalbard
1911 establishments in Norway